The DR Class E 11 is a class of electric locomotives formerly operated by the Deutsche Reichsbahn in East Germany. They were later operated by Deutsche Bahn, designated as Class 109.

Technical specifications

History
The first two pre-series locomotives entered service in 1961. From 1970 onward, the Class E 11 was designated as Class 211. Construction resumed until 1976, with 95 locomotives built, and one locomotive rebuilt and renumbered after a rail accident, bringing the total number of locomotives to 96. Deutsche Bahn withdrew their last former E 11 locomotive, now designated as Class 109, in May 1998.

References

Further reading

External links

E 11 001 - DB Museum website 

Electric locomotives of Germany
15 kV AC locomotives
E 11
Standard gauge locomotives of Germany
Passenger locomotives
LEW locomotives